Wichita may refer to:

People
Wichita people, a Native American tribe
Wichita language, the language of the tribe

Places in the United States
 Wichita, Kansas, a city
 Wichita County, Kansas, a county in western Kansas (city of Wichita is located in Sedgwick County)
 Wichita Falls, Texas, a city
 Wichita County, Texas
 Wichita Mountains

In the military
, a heavy cruiser class of the US Navy
, the only ship of the class; active in World War II
, a class of US Navy oilers from the late 1960s to the mid-1990s 
, the lead ship of the class; in service from 1969 to 1993
Beechcraft AT-10 Wichita, a World War II trainer airplane for the United States Army Air Forces

In entertainment
Wichita (1955 film), a 1955 American Western movie directed by Jacques Tourneur
Wichita, early title of a proposed movie, eventually made as Knight and Day starring Cameron Diaz and Tom Cruise
Wichita Recordings, a London-based independent record label

See also
Ouachita (disambiguation)
Washita (disambiguation)